Henry Edward Denison Hammond (26 November 1866 – 16 June 1910) was an English footballer who played as a right back. Hammond played club football for Oxford University and earned one cap for the national team in 1889. After his football career ended, Hammond became a folk music historian.

References

External links

1866 births
1910 deaths
English footballers
England international footballers
People educated at Lancing College
Alumni of Corpus Christi College, Oxford
Oxford University A.F.C. players
Association football fullbacks